Ladislav Vízek (born 22 January 1955 in Chlumec nad Cidlinou) is a Czech football player. He played 55 matches for Czechoslovakia and scored 13 goals.

He played in the 1982 FIFA World Cup, and was sent off in Czechoslovakia's final game, a 1–1 draw with France in Valladolid.

He was a member of the gold Czechoslovakia team at the 1980 Olympic Games and the third-placed team at 1980 UEFA European Championship.

At club level, he played for Dukla Prague for many years.

Trivia 
Vízek's daughter Pavlína married another Czech football player, Vladimír Šmicer, in 1996.

References

External links
 

1955 births
Living people
People from Chlumec nad Cidlinou
Czech footballers
Czechoslovak footballers
Czechoslovakia international footballers
Footballers at the 1980 Summer Olympics
Olympic footballers of Czechoslovakia
Olympic gold medalists for Czechoslovakia
UEFA Euro 1980 players
1982 FIFA World Cup players
Dukla Prague footballers
Le Havre AC players
Ligue 1 players
Czechoslovak expatriate footballers
Expatriate footballers in France
Olympic medalists in football
Czechoslovak expatriate sportspeople in France
Medalists at the 1980 Summer Olympics
Association football forwards
Sportspeople from the Hradec Králové Region